The 2001–02 Maltese Second Division (known as Rothmans Second Division 2001-02 due to sponsorship reasons) started on 29 September 2001 and ended on 19 May 2002.The relegated teams were Tarxien Rainbows and Zurrieq.The promoted teams were Msida SJ and Senglea Athletics. Msida SJ finished as champions, therefore being promoted once again, having just been promoted. Senglea Athletics too were promoted having just been promoted. Melita were relegated alongside Santa Venera Lightning. The latter lost a relegation playoff with Attard 1-0.

Participating teams
 Attard
 Dingli Swallows
 Gzira United
 Luqa St. Andrews
 Melita
 Mellieha
 Msida Saint-Joseph
 Senglea Athletics
 Santa Venera Lightning
 Tarxien Rainbows
 Zebbug Rangers
 Zurrieq

Changes from previous season
 Mqabba and Balzan Youths were promoted to the First Division. They were replaced with Tarxien Rainbows and Zurrieq, both relegated from 2000–01 Maltese First Division
 Santa Lucia and Siggiewi were relegated to the Third Division. They were replaced with Msida Saint-Joseph and Senglea Athletics, both promoted from the Third Division.

Final standings

Relegation play-off

|}

Santa Venera relegated to Maltese Third Division

Top scorers

External links
 Complete set of results at maltafootball.com

Maltese Second Division seasons
Malta
3